Chleby may refer to places in the Czech Republic:

Chleby (Benešov District), a municipality and village in the Central Bohemian Region
Chleby (Nymburk District), a municipality and village in the Central Bohemian Region